Barbara Gillian Ferris (born 27 July 1942, London) is an English actress and former fashion model.

She appeared in a number of films and productions for television and is possibly best remembered as Dinah, the young woman who eloped with Dave Clark in the 1965 film Catch Us If You Can. Her other roles were as diverse as the female lead in Edward Bond's controversial play Saved (1965) and a vicar's wife in the television comedy series All in Good Faith in the mid-1980s.

Screen roles of the 1960s 

Barbara Ferris made her earliest television appearances in her teens. In 1961 she played the part of barmaid Nona Willis in Granada's twice-weekly serial Coronation Street and appeared also in episodes of The Cheaters (1962) and Zero One (starring Nigel Patrick, 1963).

1960s film roles 
Ferris's films included the drama Term of Trial (1962) starring Laurence Olivier, A Pair of Briefs (1962), a romantic comedy set around the Inns of Court; Sparrers Can't Sing (1963) as Nellie Gooding; A Place to Go (1963) starring Rita Tushingham and Bernard Lee; Bitter Harvest (1963) with Janet Munro and John Stride; Children of the Damned (1964) starring Ian Hendry, in which a group of children brought to London by UNESCO turned out to be humans advanced by a million years; Michael Winner's The System (1964), with Oliver Reed and Julia Foster, an early "Swinging London"-style sex comedy about young loafers at a seaside resort; Catch Us If You Can (1965), which featured the rock band the Dave Clark Five and owed much to The Beatles' A Hard Day's Night the previous year; Interlude (1968), alongside Oskar Werner, John Cleese and Donald Sutherland, which film historian Leslie Halliwell described as "Intermezzo remade for the swinging London set"; and Desmond Davis's A Nice Girl Like Me (1969), in which Ferris played a young woman named Candida who kept getting pregnant ("Candida isn't much for sex but she's big on babies" as one critic put it).

Saved
Ferris played the leading female role in Edward Bond's play Saved at the Royal Court Theatre in London in 1965. This was subject to censorship by the Lord Chamberlain who was instrumental in bringing a successful prosecution when the producers went ahead and staged the play without cuts before private audiences. Despite the controversial subject matter, which included a scene in which a baby was stoned to death in its pram, the case was a step towards the Lord Chamberlain's losing his censorship role under the Theatres Act 1968.

Writer and critic Bernard Levin later opined that Saved contained "extremes [of cruelty] never seen before outside the Grand Guignol, or possibly even inside", while Ferris's character was described at the time by The Daily Telegraphs critic W.A. Darlington as "a young virago with a screech that afflicts the ear-drums".

Later roles

Among Ferris's later television roles were as Emilie Trampusch in The Strauss Family (1972), Elizabeth in Elizabeth Alone (1981) and Emma Lambe, the wife of a vicar played by Richard Briers, in the first two series of All in Good Faith (1985–87). She also appeared as Briers' wife, Enid Washbrook, in Michael Winner's film of Alan Ayckbourn's comedy A Chorus of Disapproval (1988). Depicting the tensions and rivalries among a provincial repertory company rehearsing The Beggar's Opera, the Washbrooks' daughter Linda was played by a young Patsy Kensit. Ferris was also in The Krays (1990), a film based on the lives of the Kray twins, who were leading figures in the criminal underworld of London's East End in the 1960s.

On stage Ferris played the lead female role (Marion) in Terence Frisby's There's a Girl in My Soup (1966) at London's Globe Theatre opposite Donald Sinden, which for a time held the record as the longest running comedy in the West End (although by then Ferris had been succeeded in the part by Belinda Carroll). She played the leading role of Belinda in Ayckbourn's Season's Greetings, a black farce about a family Christmas which opened at the Apollo Theatre in London in 1982.

Personal

Ferris gave a number of well-regarded performances, but she did not become a big star. Equally, although ostensibly she fitted the stereotypical image of a mid-1960s blonde, she was never really a "starlet", a characteristic she shared with, among other actresses of a similar mould, Julie Christie and Carol White. For a while, after Catch Us If You Can, she acquired a certain "pin-up" status The New York Times''' review of A Nice Girl Like You'' by Roger Greenspun contained a vignette of Ferris in the late 1960s:"Barbara Ferris is a strong-featured girl with an odd facial resemblance to Noël Coward. Despite her winsome smile, flaxen hair and peaches-and-cream complexion, she plays innocence as if it were an allegory of experience and lines of calculation enmesh the cornflowers."

Filmography

Notes

External links
 

English film actresses
English television actresses
English female models
Actresses from London
1942 births
Living people
20th-century English actresses